Suhadol ( or ) is a settlement on the left bank of the Sava River in the Municipality of Laško in eastern Slovenia. The railway line from Ljubljana to Zidani Most runs through the settlement. The area is part of the traditional region of Styria. It is now included with the rest of the municipality in the Savinja Statistical Region.

References

External links
Suhadol on Geopedia

Populated places in the Municipality of Laško